Michael Laurence Gordon Barkl OAM (born 9 August 1958) is an Australian composer and musicologist.

Biography 

Michael Barkl was born in Sydney, New South Wales in 1958 into a musical family.  He learnt classical piano from the age of seven, later becoming obsessed with the electric guitar after hearing the album Jimi Hendrix Band of Gypsys as a teenager.  From rock guitar he expanded his interests into jazz guitar, and then into bass guitar and double bass.  At the New South Wales State Conservatorium of Music he initially studied jazz improvisation with Roger Frampton, and followed this with degree studies in composition with Vincent Plush, Martin Wesley-Smith, Warren Burt, Ross Edwards, Don Banks and Graham Hair.  Postgraduate studies in composition and musicology were with Ann Ghandar, Richard Toop and Greg Schiemer.  He graduated with a master's degree in composition (University of New England (Australia)) and doctorates in musicology (Deakin University) and electronic music (University of Wollongong).

After working as a freelance bass player, Barkl joined TAFE NSW in 1987 as foundation head of its contemporary music section.  During this time he contributed a series of biographies of Australian composers to The Oxford Companion to Australian Music, A Dictionary of Australian Music, The New Grove Dictionary of Music and Musicians and The Oxford Dictionary of National Biography.  Further publications documented the compositional techniques of Franco Donatoni and Riccardo Formosa, explored aspects of the cultural context of music composition, and described the process of electronic music composition using the program Pure Data; he also published educational texts on composition, harmonic analysis and improvisation, and a volume of memoirs. From 1997 Barkl was foundation Adviser (later, Chief Examiner) of Contemporary Popular Music for the Australian Music Examinations Board.

Music 

Barkl's music exhibits a combination of influences from European styled modernism to jazz.  An early work, Rota (1981) for piano trio, is clearly influenced by twentieth century Italian music, specifically Franco Donatoni.  Perhaps unsurprisingly, it was awarded segnalata in the 1981 International Valentino Bucchi Composition Competition. A pair of subsequent orchestral works, Voce di testa (1981) and Voce di petto (1982), while maintaining the Italian association through their titles, added more jazz influence, however slight.  Drumming (1983) was characterised as "an exciting piano piece", "bring[ing] together Indian tabla drumming with jazz pianism", while Ballade (1984) for six instruments, structured as a reverie interrupting a café piano solo, brought Barkl to the attention of the critics, Roger Covell describing him "one of the most musical of younger Australian composers".  Subsequent works, such as Cabaret for orchestra, Blues for bass clarinet and percussion (based on a Charlie Parker riff), Disco for percussion quartet, Red for recorder (based on Jimi Hendrix’s Red House) and Smoky for harpsichord, developed Barkl’s jazz-inspired instrumental style until a complete change emerged with a series of lengthy electronic works composed using the open source patching language Pure Data.  These used large banks of computer generated oscillators to build thick textures of sine waves, saturating the aural space.

Honours 

Michael Barkl was awarded a Medal of the Order of Australia in the 2018 Queen's Birthday Honours (Australia) for "service to the performing arts and music education".

Selected works

Orchestral 

Voce di testa, 1981
Voce di petto, 1982
Iambus, 1982
Cabaret, 1985
Rondo, 1986

Ensemble 

Ballade for six instruments, 1984
The laird of Drumblair for seven instruments, 1987
Disco for four percussion and electronics, 1990

Chamber music 

Night Words for viola and piano, 1977
Music for two trumpets and tape, 1978
Rota for piano trio, 1981
Expressive and ferocious for string quartet, 1985
Blues for bass clarinet and percussion, 1986
Vamp for guitar, 1988
Red for descant recorder, 1996
Smoky for harpsichord, 1997
Coming Out, Fanfare for viola and double bass, 1998
Here… for clarinet, piano and cello, 2008

Piano 

Jazz music, 1979
Jazz music II for two pianos, 1979
Drumming, 1983
Five pieces, 1995

Choral 

Water, where are you going? SATB, 1984

Vocal 

Night words – the ravishing for mezzo-soprano and piano, 1977

Concert band 

Backyard swing, 1986

Music theatre 

The animals Noah forgot, 1988

Electronic 

Rosalia, 1980
The paradox of Pythagoras:  nos 1–27, 2007
Music of the spheres:  Mercury, Venus, Earth, Mars, Jupiter, Saturn, Uranus, Neptune, Pluto, 2007
Music of Grace:  The heavy dark trees line the streets of summer, 2007
Music of Grace:  The cat dances and the moon shines brightly, 2007
Music of Grace:  The crystals in the cave absorb the light as if they have not seen it in a million years, 2008

References

External links 
https://www.australianmusiccentre.com.au/artist/barkl-michael Retrieved 19 June 2019.

Australian composers
Australian musicologists
1958 births
Living people
Musicians from Sydney
Recipients of the Medal of the Order of Australia